Gua may refer to:

Transport 
 GUA, station code for Guadalupe station, in Santa Barbara County, California, United States
 GUA, IATA code for La Aurora International Airport, serving Guatemala City
 GUA, station code for Guaianases on Line 11 (Coral) in São Paulo, Brazil

Places 
 Gúa, a parish in Somiedo, Asturias, Spain
 Guà, a commune in Alessandria, Piedmont, Italy
 Gua, Jharkhand, a census town in India
 Gua (Tanzanian ward), a ward in Chunya District, Tanzania
 GUA, IOC and UNDP country codes for Guatemala
 MX-GUA, the ISO 3166-2 code for the Mexican state of Guanajuato
 Gua, a subdistrict of Lipis District in Pahang, Malaysia
 Le Gua (disambiguation), the name of two different communes in France

Biology 
 GUA, a codon for the amino acid valine
 Gua or Guanine, a nucleobase found in the nucleic acids DNA and RNA

Languages 
 Gua language, a Guang language of coastal Ghana
 ISO 639:gua, the Shiki language of northern Nigeria

Music 
 Ali Gua Gua, former member of Argentine band Kumbia Queers
 Gua Ah-leh (born 1944), Chinese actress and singer
 Gua, a 2004 album by Emmanuel Jal
 "Guá", a track on the 1975 album Jóia by Caetano Veloso
"Gua Time", hit song by the 80's boy band Mancha Manchew

Other uses 
 Gua (chimpanzee) (1930–1933), a chimpanzee raised as though she were a human child
 GUA, Global Unicast Address
 Gua, an alien race in the Canadian TV series First Wave
 Growing Up Absurd, 1960 book by Paul Goodman
 Gua Ah-leh (born 1944), Chinese actress and singer
 Alan Gua, a mythical figure from The Secret History of the Mongols

See also
 Guas, a surname (including a list of people with the name)
 Gau Island, an island in Fiji
 GWA (disambiguation)
 Le Gua (disambiguation)
 Guha (disambiguation)